Physma is a genus of cyanolichens in the family Pannariaceae. It has five species. The genus was circumscribed by Italian lichenologist Abramo Bartolommeo Massalongo in  1854, with Physma boryanum assigned as the type species.

Species
Physma ahtianum 
Physma boryanum 
Physma byrsaeum 
Physma chilense 
Physma pseudoisidiatum

References

Peltigerales
Lichen genera
Peltigerales genera
Taxa described in 1854
Taxa named by Abramo Bartolommeo Massalongo